Rolette Public School District No. 29 is a school district headquartered in Rolette, North Dakota. It operates Rolette Public School.

Within Rolette County, the district serves Rolette, Mylo, and small sections of Shell Valley.

History
In 1968 there was an election on whether to increase the mills of the tax by 50%, but voters voted against it on a 217 against versus 156 for.

In 2002 the school had 215 students, and the rate of students attending tertiary education was about 90%. Bonnie Muehlberg in The Bismarck Tribune wrote that "As in many smaller communities, the school serves as a hub for activities and events."

When Wolford School District closed in 2019, Rolette School was an option for those students. Upon disestablishment of the Wolford district, Rolette is to take a portion of the district.

References

External links
 Rolette Public School
School districts in North Dakota
Education in Rolette County, North Dakota